Abel Tador (28 October 1984 – 14 June 2009) was a Nigerian professional footballer.

Career
Tador was captain of club side Bayelsa United, and led his side to the 2008–09 Nigerian Premier League. He formerly played for NPA and Sharks.

Death
However, just hours after his side won the championship, Tador was shot dead by armed robbers in the Niger Delta.

References

1984 births
2009 deaths
2009 murders in Nigeria
Association football midfielders
Bayelsa United F.C. players
Deaths by firearm in Nigeria
Male murder victims
Nigerian footballers
Nigerian murder victims
People murdered in Nigeria
Robberies in Nigeria
Sharks F.C. players
Sportspeople from Lagos
Warri Wolves F.C. players